Hinch is a surname. Notable people with the surname include:

A. J. Hinch (born 1974), American baseball manager and former player
Derryn Hinch, Australian television host and former politician
Hinch Live, now simply Hinch, a Sky News television program hosted by Derryn Hinch
Dick Hinch (1949–2020), American politician
Jimmy Hinch, English footballer
John Hinch (mathematician), mathematician
John Hinch (musician), British drummer
Maddie Hinch, English field hockey player
Mrs Hinch, British influencer

See also
Hinch, Missouri
Hinch, West Virginia